The Civil Service Club is a London social club, founded in 1953, for current and former members of the UK Civil Service and His Majesty's Diplomatic Service.

In advance of the wedding of the Princess Elizabeth and Lieutenant Philip Mountbatten, RN, Duke of Edinburgh, which took place on 20 November 1947 at Westminster Abbey, the Home Civil Service and Foreign Service undertook a collection for the purpose of purchasing a suitable present to celebrate the royal nuptials. Two silver salvers were purchased, after which the balance of the Wedding Fund collected by the Home Civil Service and the Foreign Service was £14,037.

The Princess Elizabeth was touched by the kindness of the gesture and made her wish known that the balance should be handed over with the express intention that it be utilised to establish a social facility for civil servants: ‘on condition that membership should be available to all grades and classes at a subscription within reach of all.’

A suitable premises was found at 13-15 Great Scotland Yard and the Civil Service Club in Great Scotland Yard was brought into being as a social centre for all civil servants, both serving and retired, and opened its doors on the morning of 2 February 1953 where it continues to operate to this day. Her Majesty The Queen is the patron of The Civil Service Club

Originally the building was a horse-drawn Fire station. It has large windows at the front of the property which were originally the doors. In keeping with tradition, the building next door, on the way to Whitehall, is the Metropolitan Police horse stables.

The club provides a bar with pub-style food, a dining room with silver service, several meeting rooms and accommodation for members. It a membership club for serving and former civil servants. There is a nickname "sanctuary", which refers to it being a safe place. A member can sit in peace without fear that any Member of Parliament can even enter the building .

References

Bibliography 

 Quinlan, Mark (2020). . London: Civil Service Club 
 Seymour, Norman (1992).  London: Ministry of Defence.

External links
Civil Service Club home page

1953 establishments in England
Buildings and structures in the City of Westminster